Au clair de la lune is a Canadian drama film, directed by André Forcier and released in 1983. The film stars Guy L'Écuyer as Albert, a washed-up former bowling champion living in his car while dreaming of recapturing his past success, and Michel Côté as François, an albino who moves into the car after Bert saves his life.

The film received four Genie Award nominations at the 5th Genie Awards in 1984: Best Actor (L'Écuyer), Best Director (Forcier), Best Costume Design (François Laplante) and Best Original Score (Joël Bienvenue).

References

External links 
 

1983 films
Canadian drama films
Films directed by André Forcier
French-language Canadian films
1980s Canadian films